Roskilde Station ( or Roskilde Banegård) is the principal railway station serving the city of Roskilde, Denmark, situated on the Danish Main Line between Copenhagen and Jutland. The station is also a terminus for the Lille Syd Line which connects Roskilde to Næstved by way of Køge, and the Nordvest Line to Kalundborg.

Completed in 1847, it is the oldest railway station in Denmark still in use. It was listed in 1964.

History

Roskilde railway station was built as part of the Copenhagen-Roskilde Line, Denmark's first railway line, which was completed for the Zealand Railway Company (Det Sjællandske Jernbaneselskab) by British engineering company William Radford. It was long thought that the construction company also designed the station in Roskilde but it has later been established that the architect was J.F. Meyer, a Dane.

The design of the station is believed to have been inspired by Villa Borghese in Rome. Facing the city centre, the front of the original station building is symmetrical with two short rectangular towers with flat roofs flanking the main entrance. A loggia in front of the main entrance, now removed, was topped by a balcony in front of a restaurant.

Roskilde station was inaugurated in connection with the opening of the railway line on 26 June 1847. Copenhagen Central Station has been moved twice since then, the current building being from 1911, making Roskilde station the oldest station building in the country though both the building and platforms have been expanded several times over the years.

The station saw a major refurbishment from 1998 to 2002. The facade was brought back to its original colouring, the roof and tunnels were renovated, elevators and automatic doors were installed, and the arrival hall received new paving and furnishings.

The station building was listed in 1964. The adjacent carriage house complex from 1898/1920 was listed in 1991.

Services
Roskilde station serves inter city, regional and international trains.

See also
 Ro's Torv
 List of railway stations in Denmark

References

External links

 Roskilde station in DSB's datebase

Railway stations in Region Zealand
Listed buildings and structures in Roskilde Municipality
Listed railway stations in Denmark
Railway stations opened in 1847
1847 establishments in Denmark
Railway stations in Denmark opened in 1847